Westhampton or Westampton may refer to a community in the United States:

 Westhampton, Massachusetts
 Westhampton, New York
 Westampton Township, New Jersey